Esteban Andrés Pavez Suazo (born 1 May 1990), known as just Esteban Pavez, is a Chilean professional footballer that currently plays for Primera División de Chile club Colo-Colo  as a midfielder.

Honours
Colo-Colo
 Primera División de Chile: 2009–C, 2014–C, 2015–A
 Copa Chile: 2016

Athletico Paranaense
 Campeonato Paranaense: 2018

Al-Nasr
 UAE League Cup: 2019–20

Chile
 China Cup: 2017

Notes

References

External links
 
 

1990 births
Living people
Footballers from Santiago
Chilean footballers
Chilean expatriate footballers
Chile international footballers
Chile youth international footballers
Colo-Colo footballers
Rangers de Talca footballers
San Marcos de Arica footballers
Unión Temuco footballers
Colo-Colo B footballers
Club Athletico Paranaense players
Al-Nasr SC (Dubai) players
Club Tijuana footballers
Chilean Primera División players
Primera B de Chile players
Segunda División Profesional de Chile players
Campeonato Brasileiro Série A players
UAE Pro League players
Liga MX players
Expatriate footballers in Brazil
Chilean expatriate sportspeople in Brazil
Expatriate footballers in the United Arab Emirates
Chilean expatriate sportspeople in the United Arab Emirates
Expatriate footballers in Mexico
Chilean expatriate sportspeople in Mexico
Association football midfielders
2019 Copa América players